Luca Casarini (Venezia, 1967) is an Italian activist and former proponent of the Tute Bianche movement. Casarini was influential in the development of the "white overalls" movement, that practiced social and civil disobedience while dressed in white overalls and padding (known as a "padded block").

On 18 March 2008 Casarini's first novel, La parte della Fortuna, was published by Mondadori.

See also

 Civil and social disobedience
 Disobbedienti
 WOMBLES
 Ya Basta

References 

Italian activists
Living people
Year of birth missing (living people)
Place of birth missing (living people)
Left Ecology Freedom politicians
Italian Left politicians
People from Mestre-Carpenedo